Budy is an urban-type settlement in Kharkiv Raion of Kharkiv Oblast in Ukraine. It is located on the left bank of the Merefa, in the drainage basin of the Don. Budy belongs to Pivdenne urban hromada, one of the hromadas of Ukraine. Population:

Economy

Transportation
Budy railway station, located in the settlement, is on the railway connecting Liubotyn and Merefa. There is infrequent passenger traffic.

The settlement is included in the road network of Kharkiv urban agglomeration.

References

Urban-type settlements in Kharkiv Raion
Kharkovsky Uyezd